WRRE (Maranatha Radio Ministries 1460 AM) is a Religious radio station licensed in Juncos, Puerto Rico, the station serves the Puerto Rico area. The station is owned by Hector Delgado, through licensee Maranatha Radio Ministries. Hector Delgado, known as Hector "El Father", former Puerto Rican singer of reggaeton and is considered one of the most prominent singers in the history of reggaetón, winner of important awards such as the Billboard. In 2008 he retired from the genre to become to the gospel. WRRE is part of the Maranatha Radio Ministries Network.

The station was assigned the WRRE call letters by the Federal Communications Commission on July 15, 1989.

History
In the beginning of the 1960s, the planning and construction of a powerful radio station on the 1460 AM frequency near the city of Juncos that covered the entire island of Puerto Rico with its sister station WFBA in San Sebastian (covering the northwest area On the same frequency, now WLRP). In 1971 it was called Radio Cid (WCID), then in 1977 changed its name to WFAB "La Fabulosa de Juncos". During the 1980s and 1990s, the station changed to a Christian format under the names of Radio Maranatha, then WRRE "Radio Redentor del Este", "Radio Emanuel", "Radio Viva" and "Sonido Santidad".
 
From October 7, 2015, Hector Delgado acquires and relaunches WRRE, in a format of Religious Ministry, and with this new format WRRE will initiate its new brand, known as "Maranatha Radio Ministries" simultaneously transmitting through its YouTube Channel, APP, Web Page, Facebook Live and Internet Television. The Internet application (APP) of Maranatha Radio Ministries WRRE 1460 AM reached in the first 6 months the number of more than 50,000 installations in the Google Play Store, an unprecedented number in the Christian radio stations in Puerto Rico. In his most popular program of the morning called "Un Nuevo Despertar", Hector Delgado also participates with singer Julio Ramos, formerly known as "Julio Voltio". A station born in the heart of God to supply your need, is its slogan. WRRE now issues under the direction of Hector Delgado (President) and Ángel Figueroa (General Manager).

References

External links
WRRE official website 

Radio stations established in 1972
RRE
1972 establishments in Puerto Rico
Juncos, Puerto Rico